Ugandaltica wagneri, is a species of flea beetle belonging to the family Chrysomelidae. It was discovered in 2018 from canopies in the Budongo Forest, Uganda. The species was placed in the monotypic genus Ugandaltica.

Etymology
The generic name is due to the country it was found first. Specific name wagneri is in honor of collector Thomas Wagner, a specialist Afrotropical entomologist.

Description
A very small beetle with a convex body. Short antennae. Smooth frons and vertex. Frontal tubercles absent. Three-segmented labial palpi. Pronotum sub-trapezoidal. Elytra indistinctly elongate and covers pygidium. Metathoracic wings are macropterous. Dorsum brownish and shiny.

References

Alticini
Beetles described in 2018
Monotypic Chrysomelidae genera
Beetles of Africa
Insects of Uganda
Endemic fauna of Uganda